Siezbüttel is a village and a former municipality in the district of Steinburg, in Schleswig-Holstein, Germany. Since 1 January 2013, it is part of the municipality Schenefeld.

References

Former municipalities in Schleswig-Holstein
Steinburg